The discography of Iced Earth, an American heavy metal band, consists of thirteen studio releases (twelve original studio albums and one covers album), two live albums, three compilations, five singles, three videos, and eleven music videos. Originally formed as Purgatory by guitarist Jon Schaffer on January 20, 1985, the band spent five years playing live locally and went through several line-up changes. After changing their name to Iced Earth, the band recorded the demo Enter the Realm (1989), which landed them a deal with the German label, Century Media Records. One year later, the band recorded their self-titled album Iced Earth, followed by 1991's Night of the Stormrider, which peaked at number 60 on the Japanese Oricon charts. Three years later, Iced Earth released Burnt Offerings, featuring new vocalist Matt Barlow, followed by The Dark Saga (1996).

In 1997, the band re-recorded the best of their early material, and released it as a compilation titled Days of Purgatory. Released in 1998, Something Wicked This Way Comes reached number 19 on the German Media Control Charts. They followed up with the live album Alive in Athens (1999). In 2001, the band released their sixth full-length Horror Show—which reached the top 30 on the Austrian Ö3 Top 40 and German charts—and later that year, the five-disc box set Dark Genesis, which contained remastered versions of their first three studio albums, the demo Enter the Realm, and seventh studio album, titled Tribute to the Gods. The latter disc was released separately in 2002.

Two years later, Iced Earth signed a deal with SPV, and hired singer Tim "Ripper" Owens to record vocals for The Glorious Burden. The album reached the top 30 in Austria, Finland and Germany. For the first time, the band charted on the American Billboard 200, at number 145. Between 2007 and 2008, the band released two concept albums for the conclusion of the Something Wicked saga. The first part, titled Framing Armageddon (2007), reached the top 30 on the German and Swedish Sverigetopplistan charts. The following year, they released the second part The Crucible of Man, which reached the top 40 on the Austrian, Finnish, German, and Swiss charts.

On March 3, 2011, Iced Earth vocalist Matt Barlow issued a statement on the band's official website, stating that he was retiring from the band (for a second time) in order to spend more time with his family. Shortly after announcing Barlow's departure from the band, Iced Earth announced that Into Eternity frontman Stu Block had been chosen as the band's new lead vocalist. The following album, Dystopia, had commercial and critical success with many praising Stu Block as the new vocalist. The band's latest album, Incorruptible, was released on June 16, 2017.

Albums

Studio albums

Covers albums

Live albums

Compilation albums

Extended plays

Singles

Box sets

Videos

Music videos

References

External links 

Heavy metal group discographies
Discographies of American artists